Maggie Chapman is an American singer-songwriter who currently resides in Nashville, Tennessee. She released her debut album, Vignette, in September 2014.

Career
Chapman signed with Creative Nation in 2013. Her debut EP, Maggie Chapman, was released in February 2014. The EP was featured on Rolling Stone magazine and USA Today with both Teen Vogue and Kings of A&R noting her as a new artist to watch. She released her first full-length album, Vignette, on September 16, 2014. Esquire, Idolator, Just Jared Jr. Maggie co-wrote all ten tracks on the album, which was produced by Grammy-Award-winning producer Luke Laird.

Discography

Studio albums

Extended plays

Singles

References

1997 births
Living people
People from Clearwater, Florida